Becky Wahlstrom (born April 25, 1975) is an American actress. She attended the London Academy of Music and Dramatic Art in England for her college years.

Her credits to date include guest roles in television series Star Trek: Enterprise, Charmed, Mad Men, NCIS and Judging Amy, several theatre productions, including Shakespeare's Twelfth Night and the stage adaptation of Ray Bradbury's novel Fahrenheit 451, as well as a number of minor film roles. However, it was her regular supporting role as Grace Polk on the series Joan of Arcadia, alongside Amber Tamblyn, which has attracted most attention.

She is also very active in supporting, promoting, and starring in regional theatre in the Los Angeles area.

In 2017, Wahlstrom joined other actresses who accused director James Toback of sexual harassment, in her case in an ostensible audition in 1998.

Filmography

Film

Television

Video Games

References

External links
 
 Wahlstrom on  her transition from actress to writer 

1975 births
Actresses from Chicago
Living people
American television actresses
American stage actresses
American film actresses
20th-century American actresses
21st-century American actresses